Brachystomella is a genus of springtails in the family Brachystomellidae. There are more than 20 described species in Brachystomella.

Species
These 25 species belong to the genus Brachystomella:

 Brachystomella agrosa Wray, 1953
 Brachystomella arida Christiansen & Bellinger, 1980
 Brachystomella banksi (Maynard, 1951)
 Brachystomella contorta Denis, 1931
 Brachystomella curvula Gisin, 1948
 Brachystomella garayae
 Brachystomella hawaiiensis Yosii, 1965
 Brachystomella heo Christiansen & Bellinger, 1992
 Brachystomella hiemalis Yosii, 1956
 Brachystomella insulae Najt & Thibaud, 1988
 Brachystomella jeremiei Massoud & Thibaud, 1980
 Brachystomella kahakai Christiansen & Bellinger, 1992
 Brachystomella kiko Christiansen & Bellinger, 1992
 Brachystomella maritima Agren, 1903
 Brachystomella mauriesi Thibaud & Massoud, 1983
 Brachystomella momona Christiansen & Bellinger, 1992
 Brachystomella nubila Gisin, 1957
 Brachystomella parvula (Schaeffer, 1896)
 Brachystomella perraulti Thibaud & Najt, 1993
 Brachystomella porcus Denis, 1933
 Brachystomella quadrituberculata (Becker, 1905)
 Brachystomella septemoculata Denis, 1931
 Brachystomella stachi Mills, 1934
 Brachystomella unguilongus Najt & Thibaud, 1988
 Brachystomella villalobosi Cassagnau & Rapoport, 1962

References

Further reading

External links

 

Collembola
Articles created by Qbugbot
Springtail genera